Julian Gjinaj (born 24 October 1996) is an Albanian football player who currently plays as a defender for KF Oriku in the Albanian First Division.

References

1996 births
Living people
Footballers from Vlorë
Albanian footballers
Association football midfielders
Association football defenders
Flamurtari Vlorë players
KF Elbasani players
KF Oriku players
Kategoria Superiore players
Kategoria e Parë players